Perk Up is an album by the drummer Shelly Manne recorded in 1967, but not released until an issue on the Concord Jazz label in 1976.

Reception

The AllMusic site review by Scott Yanow stated, "Although the musicians are all associated with the West Coast hard bop tradition, there are plenty of moments during this stimulating set when they make it obvious that they had been listening with some interest to some of the avant-garde players, allowing the new innovations to open up their styles a bit".

Track listing
 "Perk Up" (Jimmy Rowles) - 5:39
 "I Married an Angel" (Richard Rodgers, Lorenz Hart) - 4:49
 "Seer" (Frank Strozier) - 5:47
 "Come Back" (Strozier) - 4:48
 "Yesterdays" (Jerome Kern, Otto Harbach) - 5:12
 "Drinkin' and Drivin'" (Rowles) - 6:39
 "Bleep" (Mike Wofford) - 6:25
 "Bird of Paradise" (Wofford) - 4:38

Personnel
Shelly Manne - drums
Conte Candoli - trumpet
Frank Strozier - alto saxophone, flute
Mike Wofford - piano
Monty Budwig - double bass

References

1976 albums
Concord Records albums
Shelly Manne albums